This article lists the results of CSKA Sofia in the European Cup/Champions League, UEFA Cup/Europa League and the UEFA Cup Winners' Cup since they first entered European competition in the 1956–57 season.

Total statistics

Updated as of 25 August 2022

Statistics by country
Updated 25 August 2022

Statistics by competition

UEFA Champions League / European Cup

UEFA Cup Winners' Cup / European Cup Winners' Cup

UEFA Europa League / UEFA Cup

UEFA Europa Conference League

UEFA Intertoto Cup

1956–57 European Cup

First round
First leg

Second leg

CSKA Sofia won 10–4 on aggregate.

Quarter-finals
First leg

Second leg

Red Star Belgrade won 4–3 on aggregate.

1957–58 European Cup

First round
First leg

Second leg

Vasas won 7–3 on aggregate.

1958–59 European Cup

Second round
First leg

Second leg

2–2 on aggregate.

Play off

Atlético Madrid won 3–1 in the playoff.

1959–60 European Cup

First round
First leg

Second leg

Barcelona won 8–4 on aggregate.

1960–61 European Cup

Preliminary round
First leg

Second leg

CDNA Sofia won 4–3 on aggregate.

First round
First leg

Second leg

IFK Malmö won 2–1 on aggregate.

1961–62 European Cup

First round
First leg

Second leg

Dukla Prague won 6–5 on aggregate.

1962–63 European Cup

Preliminary round
First leg

Second leg

CSKA Red Flag won 6–2 on aggregate.

First round

Second leg

Anderlecht won 4–2 on aggregate.

1965–66 European Cup Winners' Cup

First round
First leg

Second leg

CSKA Cherveno Zname won 4–1 on aggregate.

Second round
First leg

Second leg

Borussia Dortmund won 5–4 on aggregate.

1966–67 European Cup

Preliminary round
First leg

Second leg

CSKA Cherveno Zname won 6–1 on aggregate.

First round

Second leg

CSKA Cherveno Zname won 3–2 on aggregate.

Second round

Second leg

CSKA Cherveno Zname won 4–3 on aggregate.

Quarter-finals

Second leg

CSKA Cherveno Zname won 3–2 on aggregate.

Semi-finals
First leg

Second leg

2–2 on aggregate.

Internazionale won 1–0 in the play-off.

1969–70 European Cup

First round
First leg

Second leg

Ferencváros won 5–3 on aggregate.

1970–71 European Cup Winners' Cup

First round
First leg

Second leg

CSKA Sofia won 11–1 on aggregate.

Second round
First leg

Second leg

Chelsea won 2–0 on aggregate.

1971–72 European Cup

First round
First leg

Second leg

CSKA Sofia won 4–0 on aggregate.

Second round
First leg

Second leg

Benfica won 2–1 on aggregate.

1972–73 European Cup

First round
First leg

Second leg

The game was annulled due to errors in the penalty shootout procedures;

CSKA Sofia won 4–1 on aggregate.

Second round
First leg

Second leg

Ajax won 6–1 on aggregate.

1973–74 European Cup

First round
First leg

Second leg

CSKA September Flag won 4–0 on aggregate.

Second round
First leg

Second leg

CSKA Sofia won 2–1 on aggregate.

Quarter finals
First leg

Second leg

Bayern Munich won 5–3 on aggregate.

1974–75 European Cup Winners' Cup

First round
First leg

Second leg

Dynamo Kyiv won 2–0 on aggregate.

1975–76 European Cup

First round
First leg

Second leg

Juventus won 3–2 on aggregate.

1976–77 European Cup

First round
First leg

Second leg

Saint-Étienne won 1–0 on aggregate.

1977–78 UEFA Cup

First round
First leg

Second leg

Zürich won 2–1 on aggregate.

1978–79 UEFA Cup

First round
First leg

Second leg

Valencia won 5–3 on aggregate.

1979–80 UEFA Cup

First round
First leg

Second leg

Dynamo Kyiv won 3–2 on aggregate.

1980–81 European Cup

First round
First leg

Second leg

CSKA Sofia won 2–0 on aggregate.

Second round
First leg

Second leg

CSKA Sofia won 5–0 on aggregate.

Quarter finals
First leg

Second leg

Liverpool won 6–1 on aggregate.

1981–82 European Cup

First round
First leg

Second leg

CSKA September Flag won 1–0 on aggregate.

Second round
First leg

Second leg

CSKA September Flag won 3–2 on aggregate.

Quarter finals
First leg

Second leg

CSKA September Flag won on 2–1 on aggregate.

Semi finals
First leg

Second leg

Bayern Munich won 7–4 on aggregate.

1982–83 European Cup

First round
First leg

Second leg

CSKA Sofia won 2–0 on aggregate.

Second round
First leg

Second leg

2–2 on aggregate; Sporting CP won on away goals.

1983–84 European Cup

First round
First leg

Second leg

4–4 on aggregate; CSKA Sofia won on away goals.

Second round
First leg

Second leg

Roma won 2–0 on aggregate.

1984–85 UEFA Cup

First round
First leg

Second leg

CSKA Sofia won 4–3 on aggregate.

Second round
First leg

Second leg

Hamburg won 6–1 on aggregate.

1986–87 UEFA Cup

First round
First leg

Second leg

Swarovski Tirol 3–2 on aggregate.

1987–88 European Cup

First round
First leg

Second leg

Bayern Munich won 5–0 on aggregate.

1988–89 European Cup Winners' Cup

First round
First leg

Second leg

CFKA Sredets won 8–2 on aggregate.

Second round
First leg

Second leg

CFKA Sredets won 3–0 on aggregate.

Quarter-finals
First leg

Second leg

3–3 on aggregate. Won 4–3 on penalties.

Semi-finals
First leg

Second leg

Barcelona won 6–3 on aggregate.

1989–90 European Cup

First round
First leg

Second leg

CSKA Sofia won 6–2 on aggregate.

Second round
First leg

Second leg

CSKA Sofia won 5–2 on aggregate.

Quarter-finals
First leg

Second leg

Marseille won 4–1 on aggregate.

1990–91 European Cup

First round
First leg

Second leg

CSKA Sofia won 3–1 on aggregate.

Second round
First leg

Second leg

Bayern Munich won 7–0 on aggregate.

1991–92 UEFA Cup

First round
First leg

Second leg

1–1 on aggregate; CSKA Sofia won on away goals.

Second round
First leg

Second leg

Hamburg won 6–1 on aggregate.

1992–93 UEFA Champions League

First round
First leg

Second leg

Austria Wien won 5–4 on aggregate.

1993–94 European Cup Winners' Cup

First round
First leg

Second leg

CSKA Sofia won 11–1 on aggregate.

Second round
First leg

Second leg

Benfica won 6–2 on aggregate.

1994–95 UEFA Cup

Preliminary round
First leg

Second leg

CSKA Sofia won 3–0 on aggregate.

First round
First leg

UEFA invalidated this game and awarded a 3–0 win to Juventus because CSKA fielded an ineligible player, Petar Mihtarski.

Second leg

Juventus won 8–1 on aggregate.

1997–98 UEFA Champions League

First qualifying round
First leg

Second leg

Steaua București won 5–3 on aggregate.

1998–99 UEFA Cup

First qualifying round
First leg

Second leg

CSKA Sofia won 3–1 on aggregate.

Second qualifying round
First leg

Second leg

CSKA Sofia won 2–0 on aggregate.

First round
First leg

Second leg

2–2 on aggregate; CSKA Sofia won on away goals.

Second round
First leg

Second leg

Atlético Madrid won 5–2 on aggregate.

1999–2000 UEFA Cup

Qualifying round
First leg

Second leg

CSKA Sofia won 8–0 on aggregate.

First round
First leg

Second leg

Newcastle United won 4–2 on aggregate.

2000–01 UEFA Cup

Qualifying round
First leg

Second leg

CSKA Sofia won 11–2 on aggregate.

First round
First leg

Second leg

2–2 on aggregate; MTK Hungária won on away goals.

2001–02 UEFA Cup

Qualifying round
First leg

Second leg

CSKA Sofia won 5–2 on aggregate.

First round
First leg

Second leg

CSKA Sofia won 4–2 on aggregate.

Second round
First leg

Second leg

Milan won 3–0 on aggregate.

2002–03 UEFA Cup

Qualifying round
First leg

Second leg

CSKA Sofia won 5–1 on aggregate.

First round
First leg

Second leg

4–4 on aggregate; Blackburn Rovers won on away goals.

2003–04 UEFA Champions League

Second qualifying round
First leg

Second leg

CSKA Sofia won 3–0 on aggregate.

Third qualifying round
First leg

Second leg

Galatasaray won 6–0 on aggregate.

2003–04 UEFA Cup

First round
First leg

Second leg

2–2 on aggregate; Torpedo Moscow won 3–2 on penalties.

2004–05 UEFA Cup

Second qualifying round
First leg

Second leg

CSKA Sofia won 4–2 on aggregate.

First round
First leg

Second leg

Steaua București won 4–3 on aggregate.

2005–06 UEFA Champions League

Second qualifying round

Second leg

CSKA Sofia won 4–0 on aggregate.

Third qualifying round

Second leg

Liverpool won 3–2 on aggregate.

2005–06 UEFA Cup

First round
First leg

Second leg

CSKA Sofia won 2–0 on aggregate.

Group A

2006–07 UEFA Cup

First qualifying round
First leg

Second leg

CSKA Sofia won 5–1 on aggregate.

Second qualifying round
First leg

Second leg

1–1 on aggregate; CSKA Sofia won on away goals.

First round
First leg

Second leg

Beşiktaş won 4–2 on aggregate.

2007–08 UEFA Cup

Second qualifying round
First leg

Second leg

CSKA Sofia won 3–2 on aggregate.

First round
First leg

Second leg

1–1 on aggregate; Toulouse won on away goals.

2009–10 UEFA Europa League

Third qualifying round
First leg

Second leg

CSKA Sofia won 2–1 on aggregate.

Play-off round
First leg

Second leg

CSKA Sofia won 2–1 on aggregate.

Group E

2010–11 UEFA Europa League

Third qualifying round
First leg

Second leg

CSKA Sofia won 5–1 on aggregate.

Play-off round
First leg

Second leg

CSKA Sofia won 5–2 on aggregate.

Group L

2011–12 UEFA Europa League

Play-off round
First leg

Second leg

Steaua București won 3–1 on aggregate.

2012–13 UEFA Europa League

Second qualifying round
First leg

Second leg

1–1 on aggregate; Mura 05 won on away goals.

2014–15 UEFA Europa League

Second qualifying round
First leg

Second leg
1–1 on aggregate; Zimbru Chișinău won on away goals.

2018–19 UEFA Europa League

First qualifying round
First leg

Second leg
1–1 on aggregate. CSKA won 5−3 on penalty shootout.

Second qualifying round
First leg

Second leg
CSKA Sofia won 6–1 on aggregate.

Third qualifying round
First leg

Second leg
Copenhagen won 4–2 on aggregate.

2019–20 UEFA Europa League

First qualifying round
First leg

Second leg
CSKA Sofia won 4–0 on aggregate.

Second qualifying round

First leg

Second leg
1–1 on aggregate. CSKA won 4−3 on penalty shootout.

Third qualifying round
First leg

Second leg
Zorya Luhansk won 2–1 on aggregate.

2020–21 UEFA Europa League

First qualifying round

Second qualifying round

Third qualifying round

Play-off round

Group A

2021–22 UEFA Europa Conference League

Second qualifying round
First leg

Second leg
0–0 on aggregate. CSKA won 3−1 on penalty shootout.

Third qualifying round
First leg

Second leg
CSKA Sofia won 5–3 on aggregate.

Play-off round
First leg

Second leg
CSKA Sofia won 3–2 on aggregate.

Group C

2022–23 UEFA Europa Conference League

Second qualifying round
First leg

Second leg
CSKA Sofia won 4–0 on aggregate.

Third qualifying round
First leg

Second leg
CSKA Sofia won 2–1 on aggregate.

Play-off round
First leg

Second leg
Basel won 2–1 on aggregate.

Notes

References

European football
CSKA